Starter is a Franco-Belgian comics series created by André Franquin (drawings) and Jidéhem (drawings and scripts) in Spirou.

History

It originated in from a similarly titled periodical column about automobiles, written by Jacques Wauters in Spirou from 1952 on. In 1956 André Franquin started illustrating these columns and drew a little mechanic named Starter. One year later, his workload for the magazine had become massive, and he left the illustration work to Jidéhem, who had a notable talent for drawing automobiles. Jidéhem wrote and drew the column until 1978. Starter collected more than 700 episodes, full with beautiful technical drawings and technologically correct information.

The column was originally just text, with a few illustrations. Eventually it evolved into an adventure comic around Starter the mechanic. One of the side characters, Sophie, was introduced in 1964 and would eventually receive her own spin-off named Sophie.

Since, several books have been published with info and art from the Starter Columns.

Notes

Sources

External links
List of stories in bédéthèque

Belgian comic strips
Belgian comics titles
1952 comics debuts
Columns (periodical)
Comics characters introduced in 1952
Adventure comics
Educational comics
Belgian comics characters
Fictional Belgian people
Fictional racing drivers
Motorsports comics
Dupuis titles
Comics set in Belgium
Male characters in comics